The following list includes all of the Canadian Register of Historic Places listings in Fraser Valley Regional District, British Columbia.

References

(references appear in the table above as external links)

Fraser Valley Regional District